In electronics, steady state is an equilibrium condition of a circuit or network that occurs as the effects of transients are no longer important. Steady state is reached (attained) after transient (initial, oscillating or turbulent) state has subsided. During steady state, a system is in relative stability.

Steady state determination is an important topic, because many design specifications of electronic systems are given in terms of the steady-state characteristics. Periodic steady-state solution is also a prerequisite for small signal dynamic modeling. Steady-state analysis is therefore an indispensable component of the design process.

Calculation methods
Steady state calculation methods can be sorted into time-domain  algorithms (time domain sensitivities, shooting) and frequency-domain algorithms (harmonic balance) methods, are the best choice for most microwave circuits excited with sinusoidal signals (e.g. mixers, power amplifiers).

Time domain methods
Time domain methods can be further divided into one step methods (time domain sensitivities) and iterative methods (shooting methods). One step methods require derivatives to compute the steady state; whenever those are not readily available at hand, iterative methods come into focus.

See also
 Frequency response
 Stiff circuits
 Harmonic balance
 Time domain sensitivities
 Shooting method
 Transient response

Further reading
 Jan Ogrodsky - Circuit Simulation and Algorithms. CRC Press

Electrical engineering